271P/van Houten–Lemmon (previously P/1960 S1 and ) is a short-period comet discovered in 1966 by Cornelis Johannes van Houten and Ingrid van Houten-Groeneveld on eight Palomar plates taken by Tom Gehrels  between 24 September and 26 October 1960 as a hazy object of 17th magnitude. It was considered lost and designated D/1960 S1 until recovered by the Mount Lemmon Survey on 17 September 2012.

References

External links 
 D/1960 S1 orbit bu Kazuo Kinoshita
 MPEC 2012-U98 : P/1960 S1 = 2012 TB36 (van Houten-Lemmon)

Periodic comets
0271
Astronomical objects discovered in 1966